New Westminster is a city in the Canadian province of British Columbia; formerly the colonial capital (1858–66).

New Westminster may also refer to:
New Westminster Secondary School, the only high school in the city
New Westminster Station, a rapid transit station in the city
Diocese of New Westminster (disambiguation)
 Anglican Diocese of New Westminster, an Anglican church of Canada diocese in British Columbia
 Ukrainian Catholic Eparchy of New Westminster, an eparchy of the Ukrainian Catholic Church in British Columbia
 Roman Catholic Diocese of New Westminster, a former Roman Catholic church diocese in British Columbia
New Westminster Bruins (15 seasons over 1971–1988), a Canadian junior ice hockey team
New Westminster Royals (1911–1914, 1942–1959), a Canadian senior hockey team
New Westminster Royals (14 seasons over 1962–1991), now the Surrey Eagles, a Canadian junior ice hockey team
MV Queen of New Westminster, a ferry in the fleet of BC Ferries
New Westminster Land District is a legal land subdivision in British Columbia
New Westminster Salmonbellies, a professional lacrosse team

See also
New Westminster (electoral districts)

New Westminster

eo:New Westminster